Bitter Apples is a 1927 American silent drama film directed by Harry O. Hoyt and starring Monte Blue, Myrna Loy, and Paul Ellis.

Cast
 Monte Blue as John Wyncote  
 Myrna Loy as Belinda White  
 Paul Ellis as Stefani Blanco  
 Charles Hill Mailes as Cyrus Thornden  
 Sidney De Gray as Joseph Blanco  
 Ruby Blaine as Mrs. Channing  
 Patricia Grey as Wyncote's secretary

Preservation status
The film is currently lost. In February 1956, Jack Warner sold the rights to all of his pre-December 1949 films to Associated Artists Productions. In 1969, UA donated 16mm prints of some Warner Bros. films from outside the United States. No copies of Bitter Apples are known to exist.

References

External links

1927 films
1927 drama films
1920s English-language films
American silent feature films
Silent American drama films
Films directed by Harry O. Hoyt
Warner Bros. films
American black-and-white films
Lost American films
Lost drama films
1927 lost films
1920s American films